Joseph Kinney may refer to:

 Joe Kinney (baseball), American college baseball coach and player
 Joe Kinney (basketball) (1912–1975), American basketball player
 Joseph Robbins Kinney (1839–1919), merchant, notary public and political figure in Nova Scotia, Canada
 Joseph Kinney Jr. (1799–1875), American farmer and politician